Water's Journey: The Hidden Rivers of Florida is a documentary film by Wes Skiles that tracks the path of water through the Floridan aquifer, where a team reveals the journey of water above and within the earth. Viewers are transported through a world that reveals how their lives are intertwined with the water they drink.

Synopsis
The documentary features footage of cave diving to document the path of water.  Its purpose is to educate on water conservation.

American documentary films
2003 films
2003 documentary films
Films shot in Florida
Documentary films about water and the environment
Documentary films about Florida
2000s English-language films
2000s American films
English-language documentary films